Lutowiska  (Litovyshchi; 1944-1957: Shevchenko/Szewczenko) is a village in Bieszczady County, in the Subcarpathian Voivodeship of south-eastern Poland, close to the border with Ukraine.

It is the seat of the gmina (administrative district) called Gmina Lutowiska.

The village has a population of 750.

See also
 1951 Polish–Soviet territorial exchange

References

Villages in Bieszczady County
Ruthenian Voivodeship
Populated places in the Kingdom of Galicia and Lodomeria
Lwów Voivodeship